Stizocera suturalis is a species of beetle in the family Cerambycidae. It was described by Martins and Napp in 1992.

References

Stizocera
Beetles described in 1992